The Bacon Hotel, also known as the Sunrise Hotel, is a historic hotel building at the southeast corner of Railroad and Homestead Roads in Whitehall, Arkansas.  It is a two-story wood-frame structure, with a cross-gable roof and a two-story porch extending across its front.  The porch is supported by spindled wooden posts, and the front gable end features a large carved sunburst design.  There are four guest rooms on each floor; those on the second level are accessed via outside stairs.  The hotel was built in 1912, during the area's timber boom, and is one of the few surviving reminders of that period.  It is also one of the state's finer railroad-era Folk Victorian hotels.

The building was listed on the National Register of Historic Places in 1995, at which time it had been reported to be functionally vacant since the 1950s.

See also
National Register of Historic Places listings in Poinsett County, Arkansas

References

Folk Victorian architecture
Hotel buildings on the National Register of Historic Places in Arkansas
Buildings and structures in Poinsett County, Arkansas
National Register of Historic Places in Poinsett County, Arkansas